The First Cabinet of Ahmet Davutoğlu was the 62nd government of the Turkish Republic, which took office on 29 August 2014. It was the fifth majority government to be formed entirely by the Justice and Development Party (AKP) and was headed by its leader and the 26th Prime Minister of Turkey, Ahmet Davutoğlu. The government assumed office during the 24th parliament of Turkey and succeeded Erdoğan's third cabinet. Davutoğlu is the third AKP politician to take office as Prime Minister, after Abdullah Gül (2002–2003) and Recep Tayyip Erdoğan (2003–2014).

The formation of the cabinet was necessitated by the election of Prime Minister Recep Tayyip Erdoğan as the 12th President of Turkey on August 10. Erdoğan, who headed the 61st government of Turkey, assumed office as President on the 28th, severing all relations with the AKP. The AKP had elected Davutoğlu as leader during an extraordinary congress on 27 August. The 62nd government of Turkey was sworn in by President Erdoğan on the 29th and was due to serve until the general election of June 2015. The failure to form a government after the election, which had resulted in a hung parliament, resulted in the government continuing its duties for much of the 25th Parliament while unsuccessful coalition negotiations were still taking place. The government was succeeded on 28 August 2015, almost exactly a year after being formed, by an interim election government as required by the Constitution of Turkey. The election government will oversee the early election that was called for November 2015.

The cabinet contained one minister who was not a Member of Parliament, namely Deputy Prime Minister Numan Kurtulmuş. Later on 3 July 2015, Vecdi Gönül also became a minister (National Defence) from outside Parliament. Hakan Fidan, the Undersecretary of the National Intelligence Organization (MİT), was also seen as a potential Minister of Foreign Affairs from outside parliament. Despite questions over his future and alleged links with Fethullah Gülen's Cemaat Movement, Ali Babacan remained as Deputy Prime Minister within the cabinet amid economic uncertainty over his position. Leading AKP politicians Binali Yıldırım, Hayati Yazıcı, Emrullah İşler and Beşir Atalay were notably not included in the cabinet.

After losing their parliamentary majority in the June 2015 general election, Prime Minister Davutoğlu arrived at the presidential palace to submit his government's resignation on 9 June 2015. President Recep Tayyip Erdoğan accepted the government's resignation, though the cabinet remained in power until Erdoğan called a general election and the interim election government was formed.

Composition

Davutoğlu was formally invited by President Recep Tayyip Erdoğan to form a cabinet in the late hours of 28 August 2014. The cabinet was announced by Davutoğlu at noon the next day.

Reshuffles

Constitutional pre-election reshuffle
In accordance to the 114th Article of the Turkish Constitution, the ministerial posts for the Departments of Justice, Transport and the Interior must be given to neutral permanent secretaries three months before a general election. The amendment was enacted following the 1960 coup d'état, supposedly because the serving leader of the opposition at the time, İsmet İnönü, had been delayed on a train by the government on his way to an electoral rally. Apparently for this reason, the resolution for the governing party to vacate the Transport, Justice and Interior Ministries was enacted in 1961 after the Democratic Party government was removed from power. The Justice and Development Party has promised in its manifesto to abolish this Constitutional requirement should it win the June 2015 general election. In accordance to this constitutional requirement, the following ministers were replaced by independent permanent secretaries on 7 March 2015, three months before the general election on 7 June 2015.
Efkan Âlâ was replaced as Interior Minister by Sebahattin Öztürk
Bekir Bozdağ was replaced as Justice Minister by Kenan İpek
Lütfi Elvan was replaced by Transport Minister by Feridun Bilgin

Minister of Defence
After the government resigned following the June 2015 general election, the Minister of Defence İsmet Yılmaz was put forward as the AKP candidate for Speaker of the Grand National Assembly for the new Parliament and was elected in the final round. As a result, his cabinet position was automatically terminated on 1 July 2015. Prime Minister Davutoğlu stated that it was not practical given Turkey's circumstances in terms of the ongoing events in the Syrian Civil War to appoint an acting Minister, instead stating that they would appoint a new National Defence Minister until a new government was formed. Former National Defence Minister Vecdi Gönül, who had served between 2002 and 2011, was appointed to succeed Yılmaz despite not being a Member of Parliament.

Dissolution
The government was scheduled to come to an end following the June 2015 general election. The AKP lost their parliamentary majority in said election, meaning that forming a new government may take significantly longer than usual due to coalition negotiations. Davutoğlu's cabinet resigned shortly after the election but stayed in power while coalition negotiations took place. With parties failing to come to a consensus, Erdoğan called an early general election for November 2015, thereby dissolving the government and inviting Davutoğlu to form an interim election government on 27 August 2015.

Ministers

References

Davutoglu
2014 establishments in Turkey
Cabinets established in 2014
Cabinets disestablished in 2015